Model Squad is an American docu-series on E!. A New York Fashion Week-themed preview episode aired on February 12, 2018. It premiered on September 4, 2018.

Premise
The show follows models and influencers in the fashion world.

Cast

Main
 Daniela Braga - Brazilian fashion model best known for her work with Victoria's Secret and Balmain
 Olivia Culpo - fashion influencer, Miss Universe 2012
 Hannah Ferguson - American  model best known for her work with Sports Illustrated Swimsuit Issue
 Ping Hue - Chinese-American model
 Nadine Leopold - Austrian model best known for her work with Victoria's Secret.
 Caroline Lowe - American model and actress
 Ashley Moore - American model
 Shanina Shaik - Australian fashion model best known for her work with Victoria's Secret.
 Devon Windsor - American model best known for her work with Victoria's Secret.

Episodes

References

2010s American documentary television series
E! original programming
2018 American television series debuts
Modeling-themed television series
English-language television shows
Television series by Lionsgate Television